The 2010 Lokomotiv Astana season was the second successive season that the club played in the Kazakhstan Premier League, the highest tier of association football in Kazakhstan.

Squad

Transfers

Winter

In:

Out:

Summer

In:

Out:

Competitions

Premier League

First round

Results summary

Results

Championship round

Results summary

Results

Final league table

Kazakhstan Cup

Squad statistics

Appearances and goals

|-
|colspan="14"|Players away from Astana on loan:

|-
|colspan="14"|Players who appeared for Astana that left during the season:

|}

Goal scorers

Clean sheets

Disciplinary record

References

FC Astana seasons
Astana
Astana